State Road 29 is an IB-class road in western Serbia, connecting Montenegro at Jabuka with Novi Pazar. It is located in Šumadija and Western Serbia.

Before the new road categorization regulation given in 2013, the route wore the following names: M 8, M 21 and P 231 (before 2012) / 26, A6 and 153 (after 2012).

The existing route is a main road with two traffic lanes. By the valid Space Plan of Republic of Serbia the road is not planned for upgrading to motorway, and is expected to be conditioned in its current state.

Section from Kolovrat to Nova Varoš is a part of European route E763.

Sections

See also 
 Roads in Serbia
 European route E763

References

External links 
 Official website - Roads of Serbia (Putevi Srbije)
 Official website - Corridors of Serbia (Koridori Srbije) (Serbian)

State roads in Serbia